Peniculimius crassus is a moth in the family Crambidae. It was described by Schouten in 1994. It is found in Malaysia (Sabah).

References

Diptychophorini
Moths described in 1994